Aglossostola is a genus of moths of the family Noctuidae.

Species
Aglossostola diana (Schaus, 1904)

References

Natural History Museum Lepidoptera genus database

Calpinae
Noctuoidea genera